Valeriani is a surname. Notable people with the surname include:

José Julio Espinoza Valeriani (born 1974), Peruvian-Italian footballer
Richard Valeriani (1932–2018), American journalist